The Zelyony Island (Green Island in English) is a river island situated in the lower reaches of the Don River, Rostov Oblast, Russia. It has the length of 4 km (from west to east), and the maximum width of 1.5 km. It is a part of Proletarian City District of Rostov-on-Don. From the south it is connected to the main channel of the Don, from the north - to the Nakhichevan channel, to the north of which there is an urban development. In the neighborhood with the Zelyony Island there is one more island - Bystry, which is much smaller in size.

Description 
The island is covered with wood and meadow vegetation. Poplar, ash and blackberries are habitat there. The beaches are mostly sandy, overgrown with sedge. There is also a public beach with amenities, recreation centers, children's camps.

The island from north to south is crossed by a single-track electrified railway line Razvilka-Bataisk. The line crosses the Nakhchivan channel and the Don along two railway bridges.

Through the Nakhichevan channel leads a pontoon bridge that provides access to the island. At the entrance to the bridge there is a barrier, but for pedestrians and cyclists access is unrestricted.

In ancient times on the island there were seasonal fishermen's camps. They belonged to the nearby Kobyakovo Settlement.

External links 
 Zelyony Island
 Zelyony Island in Rostov-on-Don

River islands of Russia
Geography of Rostov Oblast